Coleophora glymma is a moth of the family Coleophoridae.

The larvae feed on Suaeda confusa. They feed on the generative organs of their host plant.

References

glymma
Moths described in 1989